Long Sutton may refer to:

Long Sutton, Hampshire, England
Long Sutton, Lincolnshire, England
Long Sutton, Somerset, England